This is a list of species of fauna that have been observed in the U.S. state of Oklahoma.

Invertebrates

Crustaceans

Decapoda
Delaware County cave crayfish, Cambarus subterraneus
Swamp dwarf crayfish, Cambarellus puer

Insects
Hymenoptera

 Eastern carpenter bee, Xylocopa virginica
 Morrison's bumble bee, Bombus morrisoni American bumble bee, Bombus pensylvanicus Black-and-gold bumble bee, Bombus auricomus White-shouldered bumble bee, Bombus appositus Variable cuckoo bumble bee, Bombus variabilis Indiscriminate bumble bee, Bombus insularis Southern plains bumble bee, Bombus fraternus Brown-belted bumble bee, Bombus griseocollis Common eastern bumble bee, Bombus impatiens Two-spotted bumble bee, Bombus bimaculatus Half-black bumble bee, Bombus vagansLepidoptera
List of butterflies of Oklahoma

Odonata
Familiar bluet, Enallagma civileCitrine forktail, Ischnura hastataVertebrates

Amphibians
Three-toed amphiuma, Amphiuma tridactylumGreen toad, Anaxyrus debilisOklahoma salamander, Eurycea tynerensisLesser siren, Siren intermediaPlains spadefoot toad, Spea bombifronsBirds

Mammals

reptiles
Common alligator, Alligator mississippiensisSquamata
Common collared lizard, Crotaphytus collaris—the Oklahoma state reptile
Copperhead, Agkistrodon contortrixTexas night snake, Hypsiglena torquata jani''

References